The Voice of the People of Tunisia is a Tunisian political party, founded in June 2014 by Larbi Nasra, a media entrepreneur, founder and former owner of Hannibal TV station and in-law of former President Zine El Abidine Ben Ali. The name is a reference to the advertising slogan of Nasra's TV station. The party's 6 members in the Constituent Assembly had defected from other parties. Larbi Nasra is the party's candidate in the 2014 presidential election.

References

2014 establishments in Tunisia
Political parties established in 2014
Political parties in Tunisia